Ezra Sidwell (second ¼ 1885  – fourth ¼ 1949) was an English professional rugby league footballer who played in the 1900s and 1910s.

Background
Ezra Sidwell's birth was registered in Wakefield district, West Riding of Yorkshire, England, and his death aged 64 was registered in Wakefield district, West Riding of Yorkshire, England.

Playing career

Challenge Cup Final appearances
Ezra Sidwell played left-, i.e. number 4, and scored a try in Wakefield Trinity's 17-0 victory over Hull F.C. in the 1909 Challenge Cup Final during the 1908–09 season at Headingley Rugby Stadium, Leeds on Tuesday 20 April 1909, in front of a crowd of 23,587.

County Cup Final appearances
Ezra Sidwell played  in Wakefield Trinity's 8-2 victory over Huddersfield in the 1910 Yorkshire County Cup Final during the 1910–11 season at Headingley Rugby Stadium, Leeds on Saturday 3 December 1910.

Notable tour matches
Ezra Sidwell played left-, i.e. number 4, and scored a try in Wakefield Trinity's 20-13 victory over Australia in the 1908–09 Kangaroo tour of Great Britain match at Belle Vue, Wakefield on Saturday 19 December 1908.

Club career
Ezra Sidwell made his début for Wakefield Trinity during December 1904, he appears to have scored no drop-goals (or field-goals as they are currently known in Australasia), but prior to the 1974–75 season all goals, whether; conversions, penalties, or drop-goals, scored 2-points, consequently prior to this date drop-goals were often not explicitly documented, therefore '0' drop-goals may indicate drop-goals not recorded, rather than no drop-goals scored. In addition, prior to the 1949–50 season, the archaic field-goal was also still a valid means of scoring points.

Genealogical information
Ezra Sidwell's marriage to Emma (née Rowley) was registered during second ¼ 1907 in Wakefield district, they had children; John Sidwell (birth registered during first ¼ 1912 in Wakefield district), Stella Sidwell (birth registered during second ¼ 1916 in Wakefield district), and Jack Sidwell (birth registered third ¼ 1920 in Wakefield district).

References

External links
Search for "Sidwell" at rugbyleagueproject.org

1885 births
1949 deaths
English rugby league players
Rugby league players from Wakefield
Rugby league centres
Rugby league halfbacks
Wakefield Trinity players